Félix Ricardo Peña (born February 25, 1990) is a Dominican professional baseball pitcher for the Hanwha Eagles of the KBO League. He made his MLB debut in 2016. He previously played in Major League Baseball (MLB) for the Chicago Cubs and Los Angeles Angels.

Career

Chicago Cubs
On March 9, 2009, Peña signed with the Chicago Cubs as an international free agent. He made his professional debut with the DSL Cubs. He spent the 2010 season with the DSL Cubs as well, recording a 1.17 ERA in 20 appearances. He spent the 2011 season with the rookie ball AZL Cubs, pitching to a 3-2 record and 6.92 ERA. He split 2012 between the Single-A Peoria Chiefs and the Low-A Boise Hawks, accumulating a 4-2 record and 3.58 ERA between the two teams. In 2013, he played for the Single-A Kane County Cougars, pitching to a 4-7 record and 3.92 ERA with 77 strikeouts in 103.1 innings of work. He split the next year between the High-A Daytona Cubs and the Double-A Tennessee Smokies, registering a 6-10 record and 4.15 ERA across 25 appearances. He spent the 2015 season with Tennessee, recording a 7-8 record and 3.75 ERA in 129.2 innings pitched. He was assigned to the Triple-A Iowa Cubs to begin the 2016 season.

After recording a 3.41 ERA in 36 games in Iowa, Peña was called selected to the 40-man roster and promoted to the major leagues for the first time on August 19, 2016. He made his debut that day, pitching a scoreless innings and notching his first major league strikeout, punching out Daniel Descalso of the Colorado Rockies. In 11 Major League games to finish the 2016 season, Peña sported a 4.00 ERA. The Cubs would eventually make it to the playoffs and win the World Series. Peña did not participate in the postseason, but was on the 40-man roster at the time the Cubs won, earning him his first World Series ring.

Peña split the 2017 season between the major league club and Triple-A Iowa, pitching to a 5.24 ERA in 25 appearances in the majors. On October 4, 2017, Peña was designated for assignment by the Cubs following the waiver claim of Luke Farrell.

Los Angeles Angels
On October 9, 2017, Peña was traded to the Los Angeles Angels in exchange for a player to be named later. He began the 2018 season in Triple-A before being called up on June 18. He remained in the Angels rotation for the remainder of the season. He was 3-5 with a 4.18 ERA, and 85 strikeouts in  innings.

On July 12, 2019, Peña pitched seven no-hit innings, helping the Angels throw a combined no-hitter against the Seattle Mariners. On August 3, 2019, Peña was removed from a game with what was originally diagnosed as a right knee sprain. The next day, it was announced that he had torn his right ACL, ending his season. He had recorded an 8-3 record and 4.58 ERA in 22 games. In 2020, he spent the season pitching out of the bullpen, appearing in 25 games. He registered an ERA of 4.05 in  innings.

Peña recorded a ghastly 37.80 ERA in 2 appearances in 2021 for the Angels before being outrighted off of the 40-man roster on May 11, 2021. After clearing waivers, he was assigned to the Triple-A Salt Lake Bees.
With Salt Lake, Peña made 31 appearances, going 5-4 with an 8.03 ERA and 59 strikeouts. On September 24, 2021, Peña was released by the Angels.

New York Mets
On February 25, 2022, Peña signed a minor league contract with the New York Mets. He was released on June 7, 2022.

Hanwha Eagles
On June 10, 2022, Pena signed with the Hanwha Eagles of the KBO League.

References

External links

1990 births
Living people
Arizona League Cubs players
Boise Hawks players
Chicago Cubs players
Daytona Cubs players
Dominican Republic expatriate baseball players in the United States
Dominican Summer League Cubs players
Estrellas Orientales players
Iowa Cubs players
Kane County Cougars players
Los Angeles Angels players
Major League Baseball players from the Dominican Republic
Major League Baseball pitchers
Sportspeople from San Pedro de Macorís
Peoria Chiefs players
Tennessee Smokies players